Wynnestay or Wynnstay is a historic house, one of the oldest extant houses in Philadelphia, Pennsylvania. The two-and-a-half-story house was first built in 1689 as the residence of Dr. Thomas Wynne, Pennsylvania founder William Penn's personal physician and first Speaker of the Pennsylvania Provincial Assembly.

The land surrounding Wynnestay was developed starting about 1895 with the encouragement of Pennsylvania Railroad President George B. Roberts, and the building of the nearby Wynnefield Station. The house was extensively renovated in 1904, with the addition of a large ell designed by Walter Smedley.

The home was added to the National Register of Historic Places in 2008.

The home is available for touring by appointment only.

References

External links
Official web site

Houses on the National Register of Historic Places in Pennsylvania
Colonial Revival architecture in Pennsylvania
Houses completed in 1689
Houses in Philadelphia
West Philadelphia
National Register of Historic Places in Philadelphia
1689 establishments in Pennsylvania